The Kickboxing competition at the 2009 Asian Martial Arts Games took place from 3 August to 7 August at the Jhanthana Yingyong Gymnasium.

Medalists

Full contact

Low kick

Medal table

Results

Full contact

Men's 51 kg

Men's 60 kg

Men's 71 kg

Men's 75 kg

Women's 56 kg

Low kick

Men's 57 kg

Men's 63.5 kg

Men's 71 kg

Men's 81 kg

Women's 52 kg

References
 Official website – Kickboxing

2009
2009 Asian Martial Arts Games events
Asian Indoor and Martial Arts Games